The 2016–17 Copa Federación de España was the 24th edition of the Copa Federación de España, also known as Copa RFEF, a knockout competition for Spanish football clubs in Segunda División B and Tercera División. Atlético Baleares was the defending champion.

The champion would win the trophy, a cash prize of €90,152 and the qualification for the next year tournament. The runner-up would receive a cash prize of €30,051 and every semifinalist €12,020. Additionally, each winner of autonomous community tournament would receive €3,005.

The competition began in late July 2016 with the first games of the Asturias, Castile-La Mancha and Extremadura tournaments and finished on 6 April 2017 with the final of national phase.

Atlético Saguntino achieved its first national title ever after defeating Fuenlabrada in the finals.

Autonomous Communities tournaments

West Andalusia and Ceuta tournament
Four teams of the Group 10 of Tercera División registered for this tournament. Semifinals were drawn on 3 August 2016.

Semifinals
First leg

Second leg

Final
First leg

Second leg

East Andalusia and Melilla tournament
Two teams registered to play the tournament. The Andalusia Football Federation determined the order of the games on 3 August 2016.

Final
First leg

Second leg

Aragon tournament

Quarter-finals

Semifinals

Final

Asturias tournament
As usual in Asturias, the twelve best teams between Segunda División B and Tercera División who did not qualify for the Copa del Rey played this tournament. The draw was held on 20 July 2016 in the Prince Felipe Auditorium in Oviedo. The champion would get a prize of €3,000 and the 50% of the income in the final game, played in a neutral venue.

Preliminary round

Group A

Group B

Group C

Group D

Final bracket

Semifinals
First leg

Second leg

Final

Balearic Islands tournament

First round
First leg

Second leg

Semifinals
First leg

Second leg

Final
First leg

Second leg

Basque Country tournament
Four teams of the Group 4 of Tercera División registered for this tournament. Semifinals were drawn on 5 September 2016 by Basque Football Federation.

Semi-finals
First leg

Second leg

Final
First leg

Second leg

Canary Islands tournament

Final
First leg

Second leg

Cantabria tournament
The draw of the Cantabrian tournament was held on 1 July 2016 at the headquarters of the Cantabrian Football Federation. It was the third edition with the current format: a single-game knockout tournament between the eight best teams of Segunda División B and Tercera División that did not qualify to the Copa del Rey.

The winner received a prize of €3,000 and each team earned €500 per game played.

Quarter-finals

Semifinals

Final

Castile and León tournament
On 9 September 2016, the Castile-León Football Federation confirmed that three teams will join the tournament. They will play a round-robin group with one match at home and another away to determine the regional champion, who will play the National stage.

Castile-La Mancha tournament
The Copa Cervantes, reinstated by the Castile-La Mancha government, also acts as Copa RFEF qualifier for Castile-La Mancha teams. The draw was held in Toledo the 11 July 2016.

Albacete, Conquense, Socuéllamos and Toledo are ineligible to qualify to the national stage as regional champions, as they participate in the Copa del Rey.

First round
First leg

Second leg

Quarter-finals
First leg

Second leg

Semi-finals
First leg

Second leg

Final

Catalonia tournament
The draw was held at the headquarters of the Catalan Football Federation on 24 August 2016.

Semi-final
First leg

Second leg

Final
First leg

Second leg

Extremadura tournament
With a record of participants in the Regional competition, the games of the first round, drawn on 1 July 2016, will be played at the pitch of the worst qualified team in the 2015–16 season.

First round
Don Benito received a bye

Second round
The second round was drawn on 1 August 2016.

Third round
The third round was drawn on 8 August 2016. Jerez received a bye for the fourth round while the winner between Amanacer and Cacereño would qualify directly for the final.

Semifinal
Cacereño received a bye to the final in the previous draw.

Final

Galicia tournament
The draw was held at the headquarters of the Galician Football Federation on 5 August 2016. The matches will be played at home of team in lower division.

Round of 16

Quarter-finals

Semi-finals

Final

La Rioja tournament
The draw was held at the headquarters of the Regional Federation on 20 July 2016.

Quarter-finals

Semifinals

Final

Madrid tournament
On 16 August 2016, the Madrid Football Federation confirmed that only four teams will join the tournament. They played a round-robin group to determine the regional champion.

Murcia tournament
The draw was held at the headquarters of the Region of Murcia Football Federation on 25 August 2016.

Quarter-finals

Semi-finals

Final

Navarre tournament

Qualifying tournament

Group A

Group B

Final bracket

Semifinals

Final

Valencian Community tournament
Castellón, Orihuela and Torre Levante  played the tournament, consisting in 3 matches of 60 minutes each (2 halves of 30 minutes) in a neutral venue.

National tournament
The national tournament began 23 November 2016.

Qualified teams

Defending champion
 Atlético Baleares (3)

Teams losing Copa del Rey first round
 Andorra (4)
 Atlético Mancha Real (3)
 Atlético Saguntino (3)
 Boiro (3)
 Burgos (3)
 Conquense (4)
 Laredo (4)
 Lorca Deportiva (4)
 Murcia (3)
 Ponferradina (3)
 Prat (3)
 Real Unión (3)
 San Sebastián de los Reyes (3)
 Socuéllamos (3)
 UD Logroñés (3)
 Villa de Santa Brígida (4)
 Zamora (4)
 Zamudio (3)

Winners of Autonomous Communities tournaments
 Alavés B (4)
 Arandina (3)
 Arosa (4)
 Badajoz (4)
 Badalona (3)
 Fuenlabrada (3)
 Linares (3)
 Madridejos (4)
 Orihuela (4)
 Peña Sport (4)
 Poblense (4)
 Racing Santander B (4)
 San Fernando (3)
 Sporting Gijón B (4)
 Tenisca (4)
 Teruel (4)
 UCAM Murcia B (4)
 Varea (4)

(3) Team playing in 2016–17 Segunda División B (third tier)
(4) Team playing in 2016–17 Tercera División (fourth tier)
Slashed teams withdrew from the competition.

Round of 32
The draw for the first round was held on October 28. The matches were played between 23 November and 15 December 2016.

|}

First leg

Second leg

Round of 16
The draw for the Round of 16 was held on 16 December 2016. The matches were played between 11 and 25 January 2017.

|}

First leg

Second leg

Quarterfinals
The draw for the quarterfinals was held on 20 January 2017.

|}

First leg

Second leg

Semifinals
The draw for the semifinals was held on 10 February 2017.

|}

First leg

Second leg

Final

|}

First leg

Second leg

References

2016-17
3
2016–17 Segunda División B
2016–17 Tercera División